An election of the delegation from West Germany to the European Parliament was held in 1989.

Results
West Berlin, due to its special status, was ineligible to participate in the election. Instead, the city legislature indirectly elected three members:

References

West Germany
European Parliament elections in Germany
1989 elections in Germany